William Armstrong (3 July 1913 – 1995) was an English professional footballer.

Born in Throckley, he played for Rochdale, Aston Villa, Swindon Town and Gillingham between 1931 and 1938, making over 130 appearances in the Football League.

References

1913 births
1995 deaths
English footballers
Gillingham F.C. players
Swindon Town F.C. players
Aston Villa F.C. players
Rochdale A.F.C. players
Association footballers not categorized by position